El Puerto is the name of:

Geographic names
El Puerto de Santa María, Cádiz, Spain
El Puerto (Somiedo), a parish of Somiedo, Spain
El Puerto, Dominican Republic, a municipal district in the San Pedro de Macorís province
El Puerto, Chiriquí, Panama

Newspapers

Chile
El Puerto de San Antonio, a newspaper from San Antonio
El Puerto, a newspaper from San Antonio
El Puerto de Llico, a newspaper from Llico
El Puerto, a newspaper from Constitución by the National Party (1911–25) and the United Liberal Party (1925–29)
El Puerto, a newspaper from Pichilemu
El Puerto, a newspaper from Constitución by the Liberal Union
El Puerto, a newspaper from Quintero